Hugh Green (c. 1584 – 19 August 1642 in Dorchester) was an English Catholic priest who was beatified by the Catholic Church in 1929. He was also known as Ferdinand Brooks or Ferdinand Brown. 

Green's parents were members of the Church of England and sent him to Peterhouse, Cambridge, where he took his degree in 1605. Afterward, he converted to the Roman Catholic Church and in 1610 entered Douai College, a center for Catholic studies in the north of France. He was ordained to priesthood on 14 June 1612, and then returned to England to take up the post of a chaplain at Chideock Castle, Dorset.

On 8 March 1641, King Charles I, to placate the Puritan Parliament of England, issued a proclamation banishing all priests. Green was arrested, tried, and condemned to death in August.

Catholic sources report that in prison his constancy so affected his fellow-captives that two or three women sentenced to die with him sent him word that they would ask his absolution before death. They did so after confessing their sins to the people, and were absolved by the martyr. His executioner was quite unskilled and could not find Green's heart; the butchery, with appalling cruelty, was prolonged for nearly half an hour. After his execution,the mob played football with his head.

See also
 Catholic Church in the United Kingdom
 Douai Martyrs

References

Attribution

1584 births
1642 deaths
Converts to Roman Catholicism from Anglicanism
Alumni of Peterhouse, Cambridge
English College, Douai alumni
17th-century Roman Catholic martyrs
17th-century English Roman Catholic priests
17th-century venerated Christians
Executed Roman Catholic priests
Executed English people
People executed by Stuart England by hanging, drawing and quartering
English beatified people
One Hundred and Seven Martyrs of England and Wales